The Artist's Despair Before the Grandeur of Ancient Ruins (German: Der Künstler verzweifelnd vor der Grösse der antiken Trümmer) is a drawing in red chalk with brown wash executed between 1778–1780 by Johann Heinrich Füssli. It depicts an artist's response to ruins, namely those of the Colossus of Constantine at the Capitoline Museums in Rome. The work was acquired by the Kunsthaus Zürich in 1940.

The artist's despair may be caused by "the impossibility of emulating the greatness of the past", by the knowledge that all things must decay, or by a sense of unfulfilled longing and dislocation. Distortions of perspective and the "plunge into the abyss" along the right edge conjure up a sense of nightmare. SPQR may be read in the inscription on the base of the foot, while vegetation sprouts up near the hand; the artist, in a "fit of melancholy", is dwarfed by the fragments of the past.

See also
 Classicism
 Romanticism
 Roman sculpture
 The Anxiety of Influence

References

Ruins
18th-century drawings
Paintings in the collection of the Kunsthaus Zürich